New Longton is a village located  south west of Preston, in the district of South Ribble, in the county of Lancashire, North West England.

History
The development of New Longton was prompted by the building of the West Lancashire Railway between Preston and Southport in Victorian times. A station called "", later renamed "New Longton and Hutton" was built at the junction of what is now Station Road and Chapel Lane, where there was a level crossing.

Since the 1940s housing estate development has taken place south of Hugh Barn Lane and Wham Lane. Other small estates, including the council estate in Dickson Hey, were built on both sides of Station Road. The village lost its railway service in the 1960s, but remains a commuter village with a regular bus service into Longton and Preston City Centre, which is provided by Preston Bus. Longer distance commuting to Manchester, Merseyside and Lancaster is afforded by the proximity of the M6, M61 and M65 motorways.

Community
In 2004, New Longton was a runner up in Lancashire's Best Kept Village competition.

New Longton has two churches - All Saints' Church of England and New Longton Methodist church. Regular services are held on Sundays and on a few evenings each week.

It also has an Ofsted Outstanding school - New Longton All Saints' C of E Primary School. There are several village shops, a local Sports and Social Club, a village hall and a children's playground. The old post office building has recently been converted into a men's hairdressers 'Chapel Lane Barbers' and a cafe/shop 'Stickyweeds'.

Sports teams 
There are two main sports teams, football and cricket. In New Longton JFC (junior football club) the age groups starts at under 6 and up to under 16s. There are also three senior teams from 1st's to 3rd team. The cricket has under 11's, 13's, 15s under 17s in the 'junior' category. There are also 1st, 2nd and 3rd teams in the cricket. 

As well as these two sports, there is a bowling green for bowls and various indoor sports inside New Longton village hall.

People 
The actor and television presenter Peter Purves, known for his time on Blue Peter, was born in New Longton.

References

External links

Geography of South Ribble
Villages in Lancashire